Dongshan is a railway station on the Taiwan Railways Administration Yilan line located in Dongshan Township, Yilan County, Taiwan.

History
The station was opened on 24 March 1919.

Architecture
The station forms a shape of melon shack.

See also
 List of railway stations in Taiwan

References

External links 

1919 establishments in Taiwan
Railway stations in Yilan County, Taiwan
Railway stations opened in 1919
Railway stations served by Taiwan Railways Administration